Javier Ordaz (born 4 April 1955) is a Mexican former tennis player.

Ordaz has a career high ATP singles ranking of 390 achieved on 22 December 1980. He also has a career high ATP doubles ranking of 317 achieved on 3 April 1989.

Ordaz has 1 ATP Challenger Tour title at the 1989 San Luis Open Challenger Tour.

External links
 
 
 

1955 births
Living people
Mexican male tennis players
Tennis players at the 1979 Pan American Games
Pan American Games bronze medalists for Mexico
Pan American Games medalists in tennis
Central American and Caribbean Games medalists in tennis
Central American and Caribbean Games silver medalists for Mexico